José Antonio Walker Prieto (born 28 June 1961) is a Chilean politician and lawyer.

References

External Links
 

1961 births
Living people
21st-century Chilean lawyers
California Polytechnic State University alumni
21st-century Chilean politicians
Politicians from Santiago
Evópoli politicians
Ministers of Agriculture of Chile